Maggie Shayne (born Margaret Lewis) is an American author of more than 70 novels. Shayne has won numerous awards, including the Romance Writers of America RITA Award, multiple Reviewers' Choice and Career Achievement Awards, The Readers' Choice Award, and the P.E.A.R.L. Award among others. In addition to her work as a novelist, Shayne is active in the Wiccan religion.

Early life
Shayne was born and raised in a rural area near Syracuse, New York.

As a child, Shayne liked to tell stories and rewrite the endings of stories she had read as well as those of the horror movies she loved to watch. Her first attempt at a novel came when she was older, when she mentally wrote a story while trying to comfort a sick baby; the story envisioned was a romance due to her mood. She soon transferred the story to a yellow pad. Shayne took a job watching a neighbor's horses so that she could earn the money to buy her first typewriter. She soon finished three manuscripts, which she was unable to sell. Harlequin launched their Shadows Line, and Shayne sent a query letter to let them know that: "I'm just jumping up and down; so happy that you have created a line especially for me!" Although the editor rejected her first book, Shayne's enthusiasm spurred her to see more novels, and the second was purchased. The novel became the first of Shayne's Wings in the Night series, and Shayne to continue writing the series after the Shadows Line was closed.

Career 
Shayne has had over 70 novels published, including women's fiction, thrillers, romantic suspense, paranormal, and category romance. She has also published several non-fiction titles in the area of spiritual self-help.  She has written for five publishers including Avon Books, St. Martin's Press, Penguin Putnam, Spilled Candy Books, and MIRA Books.  Her paranormal romances combine romance and horror, where the redemption of the monster is through love. Many of her novels "[blend] mysticism into everyday life in a good vs. evil scenario."

Shayne also worked as a writer for the soap operas Guiding Light and As the World Turns and considered accepting the position of co-head-writer before deciding to devote her time to her novels.

Shayne's novels have appeared on the USA Today, Booksense and Waldenbooks bestseller lists, and Twilight Hunger reached Number 18 on the New York Times Bestseller List. Many of her books have been chosen by Doubleday Bookclub, the Mystery Guild, and Rhapsody Bookclub.  On her thirteenth nomination for a Romance Writers of America RITA Award, Shayne won the award. She has also won three Career Achievement Awards from Romantic Times Bookclub Magazine.

Personal life 
Shayne has interest in the culture and religion of ancient Sumer, and included some of her research in her novels, including Destiny.  After several years of study at the Black Forest Clan, a chartered Wiccan seminary, Shayne became a high priestess and an elder in the Wicca religion and has been licensed as a minister.  Shayne founded her own coven, the Hawks of RavenMyst, in a tradition, similar to a denomination, known as the RavenMyst Circle, that she helped found.

Shayne has five grown daughters. She married Lance on Valentine's Day in 2014. She resides in a small town in upstate New York.

Awards
1992–1993 – Romantic Times Reviewers' Choice Award, Best First Book, Reckless Angel
1993 – New Jersey Romance Writers Golden Leaf Award for Best Long Contemporary, Miranda's Viking
1993–1994 – Romantic Times Career Achievement Award, Series Romantic Fantasy
1993–1994 – Affaire de Coeur Magazine Favorite Paranormal Author of the Year
1995–1996 – Romantic Times Career Achievement Award, Romantic Fantasy
1995–1995 – Romantic Times Reviewers' Choice Award, Best Contemporary Fantasy, Fairytale
1997–1998 – Romantic Times Reviewers' Choice Award, Best Mini-Series Romance, A Husband in Time
1997–1998 – Romantic Times Reviewers' Choice Award, Best Contemporary Fantasy, Forever Enchanted
2005 – Romance Writers of America RITA Award winner, Best Novella, "Her Best Enemy"
Romantic Times Magazine Women in Search of Heroes (wISH) Award, Twilight Illusions
Romantic Times Magazine WISH Award, Born in Twilight
Romantic Times Gold Medallion Award, Twilight Illusions
Romantic Times Gold Medallion Award, Forever Enchanted'
Six-time Romance Writers of America RITA Award finalist (12-time nominee)

Bibliography

Wings in the Night Series

Wings in the Night: Reborn Series

Fairies of Rush Series

Texas Brands Series

The Littlest Cowboy (in A Brand of Christmas and The Texas Brand: In the Beginning)
The Baddest Virgin in Texas (in The Texas Brand: In the Beginning)
Badlands Bad Boy (in The Texas Brand: In the Beginning)
Long Gone Lonesome Blues FORMERLY The Husband She Couldn't Remember
The Lone Cowboy FORMERLY That Mysterious Texas Brand Man
Lone Star Lonely FORMERLY The Baddest Bride in Texas
The Outlaw Bride
Texas Angel FORMERLY Angel Meets the Badman
Texas Homecoming FORMERLY The Homecoming

The Immortal Series

Oklahoma All-Girl Brands Series

The Brands Who Came for Christmas (in A Brand of Christmas and Stranger in Town)
Brand-New Heartache (in Stranger in Town)
Secrets and Lies
A Mommy For Christmas FORMERLY Feels Like Home
One Magic Summer FORMERLY Dangerous Lover
Sweet Vidalia Brand

Mordecai Young Series

Thicker Than Water
Colder Than Ice
Darker Than Midnight

Secrets of Shadow Falls Series

The Portal Series

Brown and de Luca Series

The Shattered Sisters Series 

Reckless FORMERLY Reckless Angel
Forgotten FORMERLY Forgotten Vows
Broken FORMERLY Kiss of the Shadow Man
Hollow FORMERLY The Bride Wore a Forty-Four
Hunted

The McIntyre Men
Also called Bliss in Big Falls.

Oklahoma Christmas Blues
Oklahoma Moonshine
Oklahoma Starshine FORMERLY Oklahoma Sunlight
Shine on Oklahoma FORMERLY Oklahoma Starlight
Christmas Blues (in Buckles, Boots and Mistletoe and Baby By Christmas)

Shayne's Supernaturals

Forgotten
Magic by Moonlight FORMERLY Musketeer by Moonlight
Miranda's Viking
Everything She Does is Magic
Stargazer FORMERLY Out-of-This-World Marriage
Witch Moon
Zombies! A Love Story

Novels
Forever, Dad
A Husband in Time
Million Dollar Marriage
The Gingerbread Man
Enemy Mind
That Mysterious Man

Anthologies and collections

See also
Judy Harrow
List of occult writers
List of romantic novelists
Margot Adler
Murry Hope
Neopaganism

References

External links
Maggie Shayne Official Website

Living people
20th-century American novelists
21st-century American novelists
American romantic fiction writers
American women novelists
RITA Award winners
Wiccan priestesses
American Wiccans
Novelists from New York (state)
Women romantic fiction writers
20th-century American short story writers
21st-century American short story writers
20th-century American women writers
21st-century American women writers
Wiccan novelists
1965 births